Dead Point (2000) is a Ned Kelly Award-winning novel by Australian author Peter Temple.  This is the third novel in the author's Jack Irish series.

Dedication
"For Gerhard and Karin, dear friends, for all the good times: Kom dans, Klaradyn."

Awards
Ned Kelly Awards for Crime Writing, Best Novel, 2001: joint winner

Notes
This novel has also been published in the UK (in 2008 by Quercus as part of Bad Debts: A Jack Irish Omnibus) and in the Netherlands, in a Dutch-language edition (in 2001 by De Boekerij) with a translation by Paul Witte.

Reviews

 "Australian Crime Fiction Database" 
 "epinions" 
 "Petrona" 
 "Tangled Web" 

2000 Australian novels
Novels by Peter Temple
Novels set in Melbourne
Ned Kelly Award-winning works